Omega Tribe are an English anarcho-punk band, formed in Barnet, London in 1981.  With the roles of Hugh Vivian on guitar and vocals, Daryl Hardcastle on bass, Pete Fender on guitar and Pete Shepherd on drums, their first EP, Angry Songs, was produced by Penny Rimbaud and Pete Fender for Crass Records in 1982.

Their subsequent LP, No Love Lost, (released by Corpus Christi Records, 1983) won the hearts of many hardened anarchos and secured their place in anarcho-punk history. A far more melodic style, encouraged by producer and new guitarist Pete Fender (from Rubella Ballet), created a highly influential template that many other bands were to build on.

They released a cassette only live release on BBP tapes (www.bbprecords.co.uk) in 1984.

In 1984 Sonny Flint joined on drums, and they took on a sax and flute player Jane Keay. Pete Shepherd the original drummer switched to playing percussion.

Pete Fender departed early in 1984. Line-up changes were fairly frequent after this period and a 12" EP, "(It's a) Hard Life"/"Young John", was finally released in 1985 that showed a complete change of direction. By 1986, after the departure of vocalist and founder-member Hugh, the band was known simply as The Tribe. The band continued to maintain a presence on the UK live circuit for a further year or so but recording opportunity evaded them. Sonny Flint departed in 1987 and the band split in 1988.

Omega Tribe reformed briefly to play guest spot at Vi Subversa's 60th Birthday Bash at London's Astoria 2 in June 1995. A short incognito tour under the name of Charlie showed promise, but the band's members had other interests and the project was short-lived.

A compilation CD, Make Tea Not War, was released in 2000 on Rugger Bugger Records and a cut-down vinyl LP version was also pressed. Both albums quickly sold out.

In August 2016, Daryl Hardcastle, Hugh Vivian and Sonny Flint reunited and performed a limited number of dates between December 2016 and March 2017, including Vi Day at the 2017 AWOD Festival.  At the end of March 2017, Sonny Flint left the band.

Discography

Angry Songs EP (Crass Records 1982)
No Love Lost LP (Corpus Christi Records 1983)
Omega-Tribe Live CASSETTE (BBP RECORDS, 1983)
It's a Hard Life 12" EP (Corpus Christi Records 1985)

Compilations
Make Tea Not War CD/LP (Rugger Bugger Records 2000)

Compilation appearances
Bullshit Detector, Volume 2 (Crass Records 1982)

References

External links
Omega Tribe on Facebook
Omega Tribe on Myspace
Omega Tribe interview

Anarcho-punk groups
English punk rock groups
People from Chipping Barnet